Zakaria Allaoui El-Achraf (born 17 June 1966 in Marrakesh) is a retired Moroccan football goalkeeper.

He spent most of his career with Kawkab Marrakech, playing for the club between 1983 and 1997. Between 1998 and 2000, he played for French clubs Tours FC, SO Châtellerault and Paris FC, before finishing his career. Between 2005 and 2007, he was the goalkeeping coach for French club Troyes.

He played for the Moroccan national team in the first half of the 1990s and also made two appearances at the 1994 FIFA World Cup finals in the United States.

References

1966 births
Sportspeople from Marrakesh
Moroccan footballers
Moroccan expatriate footballers
Morocco international footballers
Living people
Tours FC players
Paris FC players
1994 FIFA World Cup players
Association football goalkeepers
Botola players
SO Châtellerault players
Kawkab Marrakech players
Expatriate footballers in France
Moroccan expatriate sportspeople in France